Marie Mansart (1925–2012) was a French film and television actress.  She played the female lead in several films during the early 1950s.

Selected filmography
 The Big Flag (1954)
 Stain in the Snow (1954)
 Royal Affairs in Versailles (1954)
 Napoleon (1955)
 Recourse in Grace (1960)
 Café du square (1969, TV series)
 Two English Girls (1971)
 Mado (1976)
 The Tiger Brigades (1978, TV series)
 Dedicatoria (1980)

References

Bibliography
 Biggs, Melissa E. French films, 1945-1993: a critical filmography of the 400 most important releases. McFarland & Company, 1996.
 Holmes, Diana & Ingram, Robert. Francois Truffaut. Manchester University Press,  2019.

External links

1925 births
2012 deaths
French film actresses
French television actresses
Actors from Dijon